Sir Isaac Shoenberg (1 March 1880 – 25 January 1963) was a British electronic engineer born in Belarus who was best known for his role in the history of television. He was the head of the EMI research team that developed the 405-line (Marconi-EMI system), the first fully electronic television system to be used in regular broadcasting when it was introduced with the BBC Television Service in 1936. It was later adopted by other TV organizations around the world.

As the head of research at EMI, Schoenberg was Alan Blumlein's supervisor when Blumlein invented stereophonic sound in 1931. Schoenberg was awarded the IET Faraday Medal by the British Institution of Electrical Engineers in 1954 and was knighted by Queen Elizabeth II in 1962.

Biography 
Shoenberg was born on 1 March 1880 to Jewish parents in Pinsk, Imperial Russia (now Belarus) and studied mathematics, mechanical engineering and electricity in St. Petersburg.

With his wife Esther, Shoenberg was the father of the British physicist David Shoenberg, the gynaecologist Rosalie Shoenberg Taylor, the psychiatrist Elisabeth Shoenberg, Mark Shoenberg and Alec Shoenberg.

Career 
In 1905, Shoenberg was employed to design and install the earliest wireless stations in Russia. However, in 1914, Shoenberg decided to emigrate to London and join the Marconi Wireless and Telegraph Company. In 1919, he became a British subject and, in 1924, he became Marconi's joint general manager.

He became general manager of the Columbia Graphophone Company in 1928. Early in 1931, Columbia and the Gramophone Company merged and became EMI and he became director of research at their new, Central Research Laboratories in Hayes, Hillingdon. He was Blumlein's supervisor there when Blumlein invented stereophonic sound.

Shoenberg's team applied in 1932 for a patent for a new device they dubbed "the Emitron", which formed the heart of the cameras they designed for the BBC.

In 1934, EMI formed a new company with Marconi with a research team led by Shoenberg which, with access to patents developed by Vladimir Zworykin and RCA, made significant contributions to the development of television including developing the electronic Marconi-EMI system, the world's first electronic high-definition television system. 

Shoenberg's team analysed how the iconoscope (or Emitron) produces an electronic signal and concluded that its real efficiency was only about 5% of the theoretical maximum. They solved this problem by developing and patenting in 1934 two new camera tubes dubbed super-Emitron and CPS Emitron. The super-Emitron was between ten and fifteen times more sensitive than the original Emitron and iconoscope tubes and, in some cases, this ratio was considerably greater.

The same year, the British government set up a committee (the "Television Committee") to advise on the future of TV broadcasting. The committee recommended that a "high definition" service (defined by them as being a system of 240 lines or more) to be run by the BBC be established. The recommendation was accepted and tenders were sought from industry. Two tenders were received: one from the Baird company offering a 240-line mechanical system, and the other from EMI offering a 405-line all-electronic one employing the Emitron. The Television Committee advised that they were unable to choose between the two systems and that both tenders should be accepted, the two systems to be run together for an experimental period.

Broadcasting of the resulting BBC Television Service from its Alexandra Palace site began on 2 November 1936, at first time-sharing broadcasts with the 240-line Baird system. However, in January 1937, after three months of trials, the Baird system was abandoned in favour of exclusive broadcasting with the 405-line Marconi-EMI system on VHF, which was more reliable and visibly superior. This was the world's first regular high-definition television service and became the standard for all British TV broadcasts until the 1960s. It was later adopted by other TV organisations around the world. The Emitron was used for the first outside broadcasting, at the televising of the Coronation of George VI and Elizabeth by the BBC in May 1937.

In 1955, Schoenberg was appointed to the board of EMI. He was awarded the IET Faraday Medal from the British Institution of Electrical Engineers in 1954 and was knighted by Queen Elizabeth II in 1962.

He died in London in 1963 and was buried in the Liberal Jewish Cemetery, Willesden, in the London Borough of Brent.

In fiction 
Schoenberg was portrayed by Leon Lissek in the 1986 TV movie The Fools on the Hill by Jack Rosenthal which dramatised the events around the first broadcasts by the BBC from Alexandra Palace in 1936.

See also
History of television

Bibliography 
"Shoenberg, Sir Isaac", Encyclopædia Britannica. Retrieved 4 January 2006.
"Sir Isaac Shoenberg", Making the Modern World. Retrieved 4 January 2006.

References

1880 births
1963 deaths
History of television in the United Kingdom
People from Pinsk
Belarusian Jews
British Jews
Television pioneers
Belarusian inventors
British inventors
Belarusian engineers
British engineers
20th-century British inventors
Burials at Liberal Jewish Cemetery, Willesden
20th-century British engineers
Emigrants from the Russian Empire to the United Kingdom